Sangrampur  is a Village Development Committee in Sarlahi District in the Janakpur Zone of south-eastern Nepal. Now, It is a part of Parsa Rural Municipality. It is the 2nd ward of this Rural Municipality. At the time of the 1991 Nepal census it had a population of 4,491 people residing in 769 individual households.

It has a Public School named as Shree Nepal Rashtriya Baiju Janta Secondary School located in the middle of the village and chowk.

References

External links
UN map of the municipalities of Sarlahi  District

Populated places in Sarlahi District